Route 218 is a two-lane east/west highway in Quebec, Canada. Its western terminus is at the junction of Route 132 in Saint-Pierre-les-Becquets and its eastern terminus is in Saint-Michel-de-Bellechasse at the junction of Route 281.

Route description
From Saint-Pierre-les-Becquets to its junction with Autoroute 20, it runs southeasterly (except from a brief northeastern-bound concurrency with Route 226) until it reaches the Bécancour River, which it follows West on its North shore until Lyster, where it shares a concurrency with Route 116. From there it turns northeasterly toward a concurrency with Route 271 in Sainte-Agathe-de-Lotbinière and its junction with Route 269 between Saint-Patrice-de-Beaurivage and Saint-Gilles, with both routes following the Beaurivage River downstream before separating at Saint-Gilles, where Route 218 crosses the river toward Saint-Lambert-de-Lauzon, where it crosses the Chaudière River. From there it goes to very join briefly the lengthy concurrency between Routes 273 and Route 175 before Route 273 separate, leaving the two others going Northeast to cross the Etchemin River in Saint-Henri-de-Lévis, where Route 175 goes Northwest while Route 218 goes Southeast for a 1 km concurrency with Route 277. Finally, it goes again northeasterly, roughly following the Boyer River toward Saint-Charles-de-Bellechasse and its terminus just south of Autoroute 20.

Municipalities along Route 218
 Saint-Pierre-les-Becquets
 Sainte-Cécile-de-Lévrard
 Sainte-Sophie-de-Lévrard
 Manseau
 Notre-Dame-de-Lourdes
 Lyster
 Sainte-Agathe-de-Lotbinière
 Saint-Gilles
 Saint-Lambert-de-Lauzon
 Saint-Henri-de-Lévis
 Saint-Charles-de-Bellechasse
 Saint-Michel-de-Bellechasse

See also
 List of Quebec provincial highways

References

External links 
 Provincial Route Map (Courtesy of the Quebec Ministry of Transportation) 
Route 218 on Google Maps

218